Senator Boyd may refer to:

Betty Boyd (Colorado legislator) (born 1943), Colorado State Senate
Elisha Boyd (1769–1841), Virginia State Senate
Jim Boyd (politician) (born 1956), Florida State Senate
John Boyd (Connecticut politician) (1799–1881), Connecticut State Senate
John W. Boyd (Wisconsin politician) (1811–1892), Wisconsin State Senate
Marion Speed Boyd (1900–1988), Tennessee State Senate
Samuel Boyd (Northern Ireland politician) (1886/1887–?), Northern Irish Senate
Thomas A. Boyd (1830–1897), Illinois State Senate